D-2-hydroxyglutarate dehydrogenase, mitochondrial is an enzyme that in humans is encoded by the D2HGDH gene.

This gene encodes D-2hydroxyglutarate dehydrogenase, a mitochondrial enzyme belonging to the FAD-binding oxidoreductase/transferase type 4 family. This enzyme, which is most active in liver and kidney but also active in heart and brain, converts D-2-hydroxyglutarate to 2-ketoglutarate. Mutations in this gene are present in D-2-hydroxyglutaric aciduria, a rare recessive neurometabolic disorder causing developmental delay, epilepsy, hypotonia, and dysmorphic features.

See also
 L2HGDH
 2-hydroxyglutarate synthase
 2-hydroxyglutarate dehydrogenase
 Hydroxyacid-oxoacid transhydrogenase

References

Further reading